In enzymology, a styrene-oxide isomerase is an enzyme that catalyzes the chemical reaction

styrene oxide  phenylacetaldehyde

Hence, this enzyme has one substrate, styrene oxide, and one product, phenylacetaldehyde.

This enzyme belongs to the family of isomerases, specifically a class of other intramolecular oxidoreductases.  The systematic name of this enzyme class is styrene-oxide isomerase (epoxide-cleaving). This enzyme is also called SOI.  This enzyme participates in styrene degradation, and is the second step of the pathway after the epoxidation of styrene by styrene monooxygenase.

References

 

EC 5.3.99
Enzymes of unknown structure